UCI Medical Center Irvine–Newport is a planned acute care, ambulatory care, and cancer research facility to be built on the northern end of the University of California, Irvine campus. The center will be a part of the larger Presidential Gateway, a 202-acre area of the campus that will also house therapeutic gardens, nature trails, and a research preserve. The construction of the hospital will bring UCI Health urgent care services onto the main campus for the first time as the original UCI Medical Center is located 13 miles away in Orange.

The hospital will feature a 24-hour emergency department as well as neurosurgery, neurology, oncology, and orthopedic programs. The costs for the facility's construction are expected to exceed  and the estimated completion date is 2025. The project is funded by private donors and has not yet achieved its funding goal.

History
The University of California, Irvine Board of Regents voted to approve construction of the facility on January 21, 2021. UCI officials broke ground on the construction site on November 15, 2021.

References

Hospitals established in 2021
University of California, Irvine main campus buildings and structures